John Harnad (born Hernád János) is a Hungarian-born Canadian mathematical physicist.  
He did his undergraduate studies at McGill University and his doctorate at the University of Oxford (D.Phil. 1972) under the supervision of John C. Taylor. His research is on integrable systems, gauge theory and random matrices.

He is currently Director of the Mathematical Physics group at the Centre de recherches mathématiques (CRM), a national research centre in mathematics at the Université de Montréal and Professor in the Department of Mathematics and Statistics at Concordia University. 
He is an affiliate member of the Perimeter Institute for Theoretical Physics 
 
and was a long-time visiting member of the Princeton Institute for Advanced Study
.

His work has had a strong impact in several domains of mathematical physics, and his publications are very widely cited.
He has made fundamental contributions on: geometrical and topological methods in gauge theory, classical and quantum integrable systems, the spectral theory of random matrices, isomonodromic deformations, the bispectral problem, integrable random processes, transformation groups and symmetries.

In 2006, he was recipient of the CAP-CRM Prize in Theoretical and Mathematical Physics

 "For his deep and lasting contributions to the theory of integrable systems with connections to gauge theory, inverse scattering and random matrices".

References

External links 
Centre de recherches mathématiques
John Harnad's home page

Living people
Canadian physicists
Canadian mathematicians
Mathematicians from Budapest
Mathematical physicists
Theoretical physicists
Hungarian emigrants to Canada
McGill University alumni
Alumni of the University of Oxford
Institute for Advanced Study visiting scholars
20th-century Canadian scientists
21st-century Canadian scientists
Year of birth missing (living people)